The STOK Elite Division is the fourth tier and the last professional football league competition in Cyprus, run by the STOK Federation of the Cypriot levels.

History
The STOK Elite Division Championship was initiated by the Cyprus Football Association and by STOK in the 2015–16 football season as the fourth level of Cypriot football in order to replace the folded Cypriot Fourth Division.

Structure

Current format
Sixteen clubs are competing in the league, playing each other twice, once at home and once away, for a total of 30 games per team. The top four clubs are promoted to the Cypriot Third Division and the bottom four are relegated to Cypriot regional levels.

Teams
The twenty four teams participating in the 2021–22 season are:

Winners 
The following teams have won the STOK Elite Division:

Performance by club

Number of participating, promoted and relegated teams per season
The number of the participated teams and the number of the teams that were promoted to the Cypriot Third Division and the teams that were relegated were changed many times over the years.

{|
|valign="top" width=21%|

Participations per club
So far, 30 teams participated in the STOK Elite Division since 2015–16 (including the 2018–19 season).

League or status at 2018–19:

References

 
4
Cyp